Internal Affairs is the first studio album by Swedish classic rock/AOR band The Night Flight Orchestra, released on 18 June 2012 via Coroner Records.

Track listing 

 * (bonus track for U.S. and Europe limited digipak edition and Japanese edition)
 ** (bonus track for Japanese edition.)

Credits

Personnel 
The Night Flight Orchestra
 Björn "Speed" Strid – vocals
 David Andersson – guitar
 Sharlee D'Angelo – bass
 Richard Larsson – keyboards
 Jonas Källsbäck – drums

References 

2012 debut albums
The Night Flight Orchestra albums